Nasrallah Onea Worthen (born March 27, 1966) is a former American football wide receiver in the National Football League (NFL) who played for the Kansas City Chiefs. He played college football for the NC State Wolfpack.

References

1966 births
Living people
American football wide receivers
American football return specialists
Kansas City Chiefs players
NC State Wolfpack football players